Vernon Campbell (born April 4, 1961) is an American film actor. His thick set, stocky build and bald head has seen him play almost entirely police detectives or bodyguards.

He appeared in the 1995 Academy Award-nominated film 12 Monkeys alongside Bruce Willis and Brad Pitt. In 1997 he appeared in the film Night Falls on Manhattan a film which starred Andy García and James Gandolfini.

He is probably best recognized as Dave Chappelle's kind natured, ill-fated bodyguard in an episode of Chappelle's Show: The Lost Episodes. In that particular episode, the bodyguard is shot by the I.R.S. and in his dying words, the guard tells Dave that it was man who shot him but Dave's greediness is what killed him. Before his death, the guard tries to tell Dave the key to keeping the show's material fresh but dies before he can say it. He stammers "You gotta...You gotta...I'm dead"

External links
 

1961 births
Living people
Male actors from Newark, New Jersey
American male film actors
African-American male actors
21st-century African-American people
20th-century African-American people